The cactus roach (Rutilus virgo) is a species of fish in the family Cyprinidae, native to the basin of the Danube River upstream of the Iron Gate, very numerous in the Sava basin. It is also recorded in the Ukrainian Zakarpattian region. This freshwater fish is up to 55  cm long.

External links

 

Rutilus
Fish described in 1852
Freshwater fish of Europe